Greece (GRE) has competed at the IAAF World Indoor Championships in Athletics. As of 2016 Greek athletes have won a total of 11 medals.

Summary

1995

1997

Greece competed with 14 athletes at the 1997 IAAF World Indoor Championships in Paris, France, from March 7 to March 9, 1997.

1999
Greece competed with 8 athletes at the 1999 IAAF World Indoor Championships in Maebashi, Japan from March 5 to March 7, 1999.

2004
Greece competed with 19 athletes at the 2004 IAAF World Indoor Championships in Budapest, Hungary between March 5 and March 7, 2004.

2008
Greece competed with 5 athletes at the 2008 IAAF World Indoor Championships in Valencia, Spain between March 7 and March 9, 2008.

2012
Greece competed with 7 athletes at the 2012 IAAF World Indoor Championships in Istanbul, Turkey between March 9 and March 12, 2012.

2014
Greece competed with 5 athletes at the 2014 IAAF World Indoor Championships in Sopot, Poland between March 7 and March 9, 2014.

2016
Greece competed with 6 athletes at the 2016 IAAF World Indoor Championships in Portland, United States between March 17 and March 20, 2016. Paraskevi Papachristou won her first medal in a major competition, while Katerina Stefanidi was third (behind Suhr and Morris), before starting her series of gold medals (European Outdoor Championships, Olympic Games, European Indoor and World Outdoor Championships).

2018
Greece competed at the 2018 IAAF World Indoor Championships in Birmingham, United Kingdom, from 1–4 March 2018. A team of 9 athletes, 4 men and 5 women, represented the country in a total of 8 events.

2022
Greece competes at the 2022 World Athletics Indoor Championships in Belgrade, Serbia, from 18–20 March 2022. A team of 6 athletes, 3 men and 3 women, represents the country in a total of 6 events.

See also 
 Greece at the IAAF World Championships in Athletics
 Greece at the European Athletics Indoor Championships
 Greece at the European Athletics Championships

References 

Greece
World Indoor Championships